At least eight ships of the Royal Netherlands Navy have been named HNLMS Tromp after Admiral Maarten Tromp (1598–1653), or his son Cornelis Tromp (1629–1691):

 HNLMS Admiraal C. Tromp, a 7-gun armed schooner, which served from 1809-1826.
 HNLMS Tromp, a 64/68 gun ship of the line launched in 1808, and sold in 1820.
 HNLMS Tromp, a 74-gun ship of the line laid down in 1830, but not completed until 1850, struck in 1867, and sold for scrap in 1872.
 , was an  unprotected cruiser.
 
 , launched in 1937, was a  light cruiser that served in World War II.
 , launched in 1973, was the lead ship of her class of guided missile frigates.
 , second of the s, entered service in 2003.

Royal Netherlands Navy ship names